Khalid bin Sultan Al Qasimi may refer to:
 Khalid bin Sultan Al Qasimi (ruler)
 Khalid bin Sultan Al Qasimi (fashion designer)